An ordinary good is a microeconomic concept used in consumer theory. It is defined as a good which creates an increase in quantity demanded when the price for the good drops or conversely a decrease in quantity demanded if the price for the good increases, ceteris paribus. It is the opposite of a Giffen good. 

Since the existence of Giffen goods outside the realm of economic theory is still contested, the pairing of Giffen goods with ordinary goods has gotten less traction in economics textbooks than the pairing normal good/inferior good used to distinguish responses to income changes. The usage of "ordinary good" is still useful since it allows a simple representation of price and income changes. A normal good is always ordinary, while an ordinary good can be normal, inferior or sticky.

Distinction between income and price effects

See also 
 Supply and demand
 Consumer theory
 Giffen good
 Inferior good
 Normal good
 Capital good

References 

 Hal Varian, Intermediate Microeconomics: A Modern Approach, Sixth Edition, chapter 6

Goods (economics)